Carousel is an album by the Jamaican musician Marcia Griffiths, released in 1990. It was her first solo album for Mango Records.

The album peaked at No. 26 on Billboard'''s Heatseekers Albums chart. "Electric Boogie", which was originally a hit in 1982, peaked at No. 51 on the Billboard Hot 100. Griffiths promoted the album by touring with the Reggae Sunsplash festival.

"Electric Boogie" is credited with popularizing the Electric Slide.

Production
Recorded in Florida, the album was produced by Rafael Vigil, Lawrence Dermer, and Joe Galdo. "Electric Boogie" was written by Bunny Wailer in 1976; the album contains a house-influenced dub remix of the track.

Critical receptionThe Boston Globe wrote that Griffiths "drops reggae in favor of a high-tech disco/R&B sound." The Washington Post praised the "radical electro-calypso reworking" of the album's cover songs. The Calgary Herald concluded that "people with happy feet may like this, but reggae fans need not apply." The Advocate stated that "despite the lavish production, the tracks don't sound repetitive ... Approaching Carousel with the knowledge that its not a real reggae record, it turns out to be a winner."

The Austin American-Statesman noted that "it all carries a sort of progressive, Jamaican, middle-of-the-road pop sound guaranteed to offend hard-core reggae fans ... But it may well serve as a crossover point, if admittedly a diluted and somewhat dubious one, for a new audience." The Gazette determined that the "production is all too slick and awash with processed horns and synthesizers ... Yet the collection is also exuberant." The Dallas Morning News'' thought that Griffiths's "innate sense of rhythm serves her well in the various contexts she sets up."

Track listing

References

Marcia Griffiths albums
1990 albums
Mango Records albums